Liina Laasma (born 13 January 1992) is an Estonian athlete specialising in the javelin throw. She represented her country at the 2013 World Championships without qualifying for the final. In addition, she won the gold medal at the 2011 European Junior Championships on home soil.

Her personal best in the event is 63.65 metres set in Rabat in 2016. This is the current national record.

Competition record

References

1992 births
Living people
People from Tõstamaa
Estonian female javelin throwers
World Athletics Championships athletes for Estonia
Athletes (track and field) at the 2016 Summer Olympics
Olympic athletes of Estonia
European Games competitors for Estonia
Athletes (track and field) at the 2019 European Games